The per capita income in Uganda in 1999 was approximately US$650 annually. In 2013, an estimated 19.5 percent of the 35 million Ugandans lived on less than US$1.00 per day.

Compiled here is a list of individuals in Uganda whose accumulated assets are known to be markedly above the rest of the individuals in the country. The list is not exhaustive, and net worth values are hard to determine.

The names are arranged alphabetically, using the first name to select rank.

See also
 List of conglomerates in Uganda
 Economy of Uganda

References

External links
 Uganda's Deepest Pockets In 2012

Who Are the Richest People in Uganda? As at 9 April 2007.

Uganda
Lists of Ugandan people
Economy of Uganda-related lists